This is a list of all managers of FC Baku, including performance records and honours.

FC Baku have had many managers and head coaches throughout their history, below is a chronological list of them from when Azerbaijan Premier League was changed into a league format.

Statistics
''Information correct as of match played 13 April 2014. Only competitive matches are counted.

Notes:
P – Total of played matches
W – Won matches
D – Drawn matches
L – Lost matches
GS – Goal scored
GA – Goals against
%W – Percentage of matches won

Nationality is indicated by the corresponding FIFA country code(s).

References

Managers
Baku
Baku
FC Baku
FC Baku managers